Brendan Jason Kiernan (born 10 November 1992) is an English professional footballer who plays as a midfielder for EFL League Two club Hartlepool United. 

He spent his early youth career at Bromley, Fulham and Crystal Palace before joining AFC Wimbledon at the age of 16. He made his league debut for AFC Wimbledon as a substitute on 18 March 2011, at the age of 18. He joined Walsall on 1 July 2021. He spent the first half of the 2022–23 season on loan at Grimsby Town.

Early life
Kiernan grew up near Arsenal's Highbury Stadium, and was an Arsenal fan.

Club career

Early career
Kiernan started his career in the youth team at Fulham, but left as a youngster to join Crystal Palace. He stayed with the club until he was 16, but was released at the end of the season in 2009. He then underwent unsuccessful trials at QPR, Derby County, Charlton, Southend, Leeds and Leicester.

He then joined the AFC Wimbledon Senior Academy at South Thames College, where he got picked for the England Colleges team.

AFC Wimbledon
The midfielder made his league debut for "The Dons" in a Conference game against Crawley Town in a 3–1 defeat on 18 March 2011, coming on as a substitute for Luke Moore. Kiernan only featured in one more game in the 2010–11 season, a 0–0 draw with Forest Green Rovers, which was his first League start for the club, securing a place in the Conference play-offs. Following AFC Wimbledon's promotion to the Football league Kiernan made his football league debut on 24 September 2011 when he came on as a substitute for Luke Moore in a 2–1 win over Bradford City in League Two. On 27 January 2012, Kiernan signed for Braintree Town on a one-month loan deal, making four appearances in total. Kiernan scored his first goal in professional football in the First Round of the League Cup against Stevenage on 14 August 2012. It would only prove to be a consolation, however, as AFC Wimbledon went on to be defeated 3–1. Having broken into the first team under manager Terry Brown at the start of the 2012 season, Kiernan left the club by mutual consent on 8 April 2013 under new manager Neal Ardley.

Bromley
Following his departure from Wimbledon, Kiernan joined his local club Conference South side Bromley in July 2013. After impressing in pre-season, he scored on his debut, netting the first goal in a 2–0 away victory against Hayes and Yeading United on 17 August 2013. A week later, he scored Bromley's third goal in a 5–1 win over local rivals Tonbridge Angels. During his non-league career Kiernan worked as a teaching assistant and a personal trainer.

Ebbsfleet United
On 5 June 2015, Kiernan's contract with Ebbsfleet expired. He nearly retired from the game, but signed for Lingfield.

Harrogate Town
After a season at Welling United, after again reaching the play off final, it was announced in May 2019, that Kiernan had joined Harrogate Town.

Walsall
Kiernan joined League Two side Walsall on a two-year contract on 1 July 2021. In November 2021 it was revealed that he was training to become a counsellor, and also acted as a mentor to young players released by clubs.

On 21 July 2022, Kiernan signed for Grimsby Town on loan until January 2023. On 24 January 2023, Grimsby decided against extending the loan deal for Kiernan, he had played 28 times in all competitions for the Mariners.

Hartlepool United
On 31 January 2023, Kiernan signed for League Two side Hartlepool United on a permanent deal.

Career statistics

Honours
Hampton & Richmond
Isthmian Premier Division: 2015–16

Harrogate Town
National League play-offs: 2020
FA Trophy: 2019–20

References

External links

1992 births
Living people
Footballers from Lambeth
English footballers
Association football midfielders
AFC Wimbledon players
Braintree Town F.C. players
Bromley F.C. players
Staines Town F.C. players
Ebbsfleet United F.C. players
Lingfield F.C. players
Hayes & Yeading United F.C. players
Hampton & Richmond Borough F.C. players
Welling United F.C. players
Harrogate Town A.F.C. players
Walsall F.C. players
Grimsby Town F.C. players
Hartlepool United F.C. players
National League (English football) players
English Football League players
Isthmian League players